Kościanka  (German: Hansfelde) is a former settlement in the administrative district of Gmina Tychowo, within Białogard County, West Pomeranian Voivodeship, in north-western Poland.

See also
History of Pomerania

References

Villages in Białogard County